Gastón Maximiliano Álvarez Suárez (born 5 April 1993) is an Argentine professional footballer who plays as a midfielder for the UAE Pro League club Baniyas .

Career

Club
Álvarez Suárez began his career with Argentine Primera División side Belgrano in 2011, making his debut on 26 September in the league against Estudiantes. Between 2014 and 2015, Álvarez Suárez was loaned out twice. Firstly to Primera B de Chile side San Marcos de Arica, before joining Primera B Nacional's Sportivo Belgrano.

Personal life
He is the nephew of fellow footballer Matías Suárez and cousin of Federico Álvarez, another footballer.

References

External links
 
 

1993 births
Living people
Argentine footballers
Argentine expatriate footballers
Argentine Primera División players
Primera B de Chile players
Primera Nacional players
UAE Pro League players
Club Atlético Belgrano footballers
San Marcos de Arica footballers
Sportivo Belgrano footballers
Club Atlético Los Andes footballers
Arsenal de Sarandí footballers
Baniyas Club players
Association football midfielders
Expatriate footballers in Chile
Argentine expatriate sportspeople in Chile
Argentine expatriate sportspeople in the United Arab Emirates
Expatriate footballers in the United Arab Emirates
Footballers from Córdoba, Argentina